Wincenty Niemojowski (1784-1834) was a Polish political activist in Congress Poland. Member of the Kalisz Opposition, later joined the revolutionary government during the November Uprising.

See also
Bonawentura Niemojowski

References
 Jerzy Jan Lerski, Historical Dictionary of Poland, 966-1945, Greenwood Press, 1996, Googe Print, p. 386

1784 births
1834 deaths
Polish politicians
November Uprising participants
Polish exiles in the Russian Empire